Anan Mirgaf Lestaluhu (born 22 September 1999) is an Indonesian professional footballer who plays as a left-back for Liga 2 club Bekasi City, on loan from Liga 1 club RANS Nusantara.

Career

Persija
Anan got his official professional debut when he played as a starter against PSIS to replace Rezaldi Hehanusa. He played 65 minutes before being substituted with Michael Orah.

Bali United
On 21 May 2019, Anan officially signed a two-year contract with Bali United, as a part of swap transfer with Feby Eka Putra went to Persija. Bali United registered him for 2019 Liga 1 to completes the quota of U-23 players.

He resigned from Bali United on 4 August 2020 because he will take the test to become a police.

RANS Cilegon
In 2021, Anan signed a contract with Indonesian Liga 2 club RANS Cilegon. He made his league debut on 28 September against Dewa United at the Gelora Bung Karno Madya Stadium, Jakarta.

Honours

Club
Persija Jakarta
 Liga 1: 2018
Bali United
 Liga 1: 2019
RANS Cilegon
 Liga 2 runner-up: 2021

References

External links
 Anan Lestaluhu at Soccerway
 Anan Lestaluhu at Liga Indonesia Official Website

1999 births
Living people
Indonesian footballers
People from Tulehu
Persija Jakarta players
Bali United F.C. players
RANS Nusantara F.C. players
Liga 1 (Indonesia) players
Liga 2 (Indonesia) players
Association football defenders
Sportspeople from Maluku (province)
21st-century Indonesian people